The 1967–68 WCJHL season was the second season of the Western Canada Junior Hockey League (WCJHL). The league adopted its new name after being known as the Canadian Major Junior Hockey League in its first season. Eleven teams completed a 60-game season, with the Estevan Bruins winning the President's Cup.

The league dropped Junior" from its name the following season, operating as the Western Canada Hockey League (WCHL) through to the completion of the 1977–78 WCHL season, renamed the next season as the Western Hockey League.

League notes 
The WCJHL added four new teams for its second season: the Flin Flon Bombers, Winnipeg Jets, Brandon Wheat Kings and Swift Current Broncos.

The Calgary Buffaloes became the Calgary Centennials

Regular season

Final standings

Scoring leaders 
Note: GP = Games played; G = Goals; A = Assists; Pts = Points; PIM = Penalties in minutes

1968 WCJHL playoffs

Quarterfinals 
 Flin Flon defeated Regina 4 games to 0
 Estevan defeated Winnipeg 4 games to 0
 Edmonton defeated Saskatoon 3 games to 2 with 2 ties
 Moose Jaw defeated Brandon 4 games to 3 with 1 tie

Semifinals 
 Flin Flon defeated Edmonton 4 games to 1 with 1 tie
 Estevan defeated Moose Jaw 4 games to 0 with 1 tie

Finals 
 Estevan defeated Flin Flon 4 games to 0 with 1 tie

All-star game 

The 1967–68 WCJHL all-star game was held in Estevan, Saskatchewan, with the WCJHL All-stars defeating the Estevan Bruins 8–7 before a crowd of 2500.

Awards

All-star teams

See also 
 1967 in sports
 1968 in sports

References 
 whl.ca
 2005–06 WHL Guide

Western Hockey League seasons
WCHL